David Michael Hollins (born May 25, 1966) is an American former third baseman in Major League Baseball.

Early life 
Hollins played baseball at Orchard Park High School, where he graduated in 1984. He attended the University of South Carolina and played college baseball for them for three seasons.

Playing career 
Hollins was selected by the San Diego Padres in the 6th round of the 1987 amateur draft. After spending three seasons in the Padres' minor league system, he was picked up by the Philadelphia Phillies in the rule 5 draft after the 1989 season. During that same year, Hollins was also a member of the National League All-Star team. In 1996, he was traded from the Minnesota Twins to the Mariners for a player-to-be-named-later. That player turned out to be David Ortiz. Hollins returned briefly to the Phillies in 2002, making their 25-man roster. However, Hollins only had 17 at bats for the team and two hits before he was placed on the disabled list due to harmful spider bites that aggravated his diabetes. On May 21, 2003, Hollins announced his retirement.

Post-playing career 
Hollins spent the  season as the hitting coach for the Binghamton Mets, a minor league affiliate of the New York Mets in the Class AA Eastern League, and Hollins is now a scout for the Philadelphia Phillies. Hollins has been named a member of the Buffalo Baseball Hall of Fame.

Personal life
Hollins's son, Dave "Bubba" Hollins, was drafted by the Detroit Tigers in the 2014 Major League Baseball Draft.

References

External links

1966 births
Living people
American expatriate baseball players in Canada
Anaheim Angels players
Baltimore Orioles scouts
Baseball players from Buffalo, New York
Boston Red Sox players
Buffalo Bisons (minor league) players
Charlotte Knights players
Cleveland Indians players
Durham Bulls players
Major League Baseball third basemen
Minnesota Twins players
National League All-Stars
People with type 1 diabetes
Philadelphia Phillies players
Philadelphia Phillies scouts
Riverside Red Wave players
Scranton/Wilkes-Barre Red Barons players
Seattle Mariners players
Spokane Indians players
Syracuse SkyChiefs players
Toronto Blue Jays players
Wichita Wranglers players
South Carolina Gamecocks baseball players